Siddharth Ray (19 July 1963– 8 March 2004), born Sushant Ray, was an actor in Hindi and Marathi films. He also appeared in a few south Indian films. He was the grandson of filmmaker V. Shantaram.

Early life

Siddharth Ray was born into a film family. He was the grandson of V. Shantaram. His mother, Charusheela Ray, was the daughter of V. Shantaram by his first wife Vimla Shantaram. His father was Dr. Subrato Ray, a Bengali economist, who had a Ph.D. from Indian Statistical Institute, Kolkata. He was of Marathi descent on his maternal side of the family and of Bengali descent from his paternal side of the family.

His father was an accomplished sitar player. Charusheela and Dr. Ray had met in one of the recording sessions. Sushanta was born into privileges from both sides. They lived in a comfortable house in Dadar, Mumbai. His father Dr. Ray was the then Chief Economic Advisor of Bombay Port Trust.

Personal Life
In 1992, Siddharth Ray married South Indian actress, Shantipriya, sister of actress Bhanupriya. They became the parents of two sons within five years of marriage. Ray died of a massive heart attack in 2004, at the age of only 40. He was survived by his wife and two sons.

Career
Ray acted in the film Chaani as a child artist. That movie was directed by his grandfather V. Shantaram. He also played young Nagya is famous marathi film 'Jait Re Jait'. As an adult, his debut film was Thodisi Bewafaii in 1980, where he appeared opposite Padmini Kolhapure. He made a mark especially with Vansh (1992), the remake of Mani Ratnam's Agni Natchathiram. He appeared in several Hindi films in the 1990s such as Vansh (1992), Parwane (1993), Baazigar (1993), Pehchaan (1993). Other films starring him are Ganga Ka Vachan, Tilak and Military Raaj. He also starred in Baazigar along with Shahrukh Khan.

He was known as Sushant Ray in the Marathi film industry and acted in commercially successful movies such as Ashi Hi Banwa Banwi with noteworthy Marathi actors such as Laxmikant Berde, Ashok Saraf and Sachin.

His last film was Charas: A Joint Operation, released the year of his death in 2004.

Filmography 
 2004 Charas: A Joint Operation
 2002 Jaani Dushman: Ek Anokhi Kahani
 2002 Pitaah
 2000 Bichhoo
 1993 Baazigar
 1993 Parwane
 1993 Khoon Ka Sindoor
 1993 Pehchaan
 1992 Yudhpath
 1992 Vansh
 1992 Ganga Ka Vachan
 1992 Tilak
 1992 Panaah
 1989 Balache Baap Brahmachari - Dinesh Patil
 1988 Ashi Hi Banwa Banwi - Shantanu Mane
 1986 Jhanjaar
 1980 Thodisi Bewafaii
 1982 Matli King
 1977 Chaani as child artist
 1977 Jait Re Jait as child artist

References

External links
 

Indian male film actors
Male actors in Hindi cinema
20th-century Indian male actors
1963 births
2004 deaths